Daniel Sosa: Sosafado is a Netflix stand-up comedy special by Mexican comic Daniel Sosa, his first stand-up special for Netflix. In Sosafado, directed by Jan Suter and Raúl Campos, Sosa talks about going from work related situations, school problems, living arrangements, questions about women and more.

Cast
 Daniel Sosa

Release
It was released on February 3, 2017 on Netflix streaming.

References

External links
 
 
 

2017 television specials
Netflix specials
Stand-up comedy concert films